Micro black holes, also called mini black holes or quantum mechanical black holes, are hypothetical tiny (<1 ) black holes, for which quantum mechanical effects play an important role. The concept that black holes may exist that are smaller than stellar mass was introduced in 1971 by Stephen Hawking.

It is possible that such black holes were created in the high-density environment of the early Universe (or Big Bang), or possibly through subsequent phase transitions (referred to as primordial black holes). They might be observed by astrophysicists through the particles they are expected to emit by Hawking radiation.

Some hypotheses involving additional space dimensions predict that micro black holes could be formed at energies as low as the TeV range, which are available in particle accelerators such as the Large Hadron Collider. Popular concerns have then been raised over end-of-the-world scenarios (see Safety of particle collisions at the Large Hadron Collider). However, such quantum black holes would instantly evaporate, either totally or leaving only a very weakly interacting residue. Beside the theoretical arguments, cosmic rays hitting the Earth do not produce any damage, although they reach energies in the range of hundreds of TeV.

Minimum mass of a black hole 
To make a black hole, one must concentrate mass or energy sufficiently that the escape velocity from the region in which it is concentrated exceeds the speed of light.

Some extensions of present physics posit the existence of extra dimensions of space. In higher-dimensional spacetime, the strength of gravity increases more rapidly with decreasing distance than in three dimensions. With certain special configurations of the extra dimensions, this effect can lower the Planck scale to the TeV range. Examples of such extensions include large extra dimensions, special cases of the Randall–Sundrum model, and string theory configurations like the GKP solutions. In such scenarios, black hole production could possibly be an important and observable effect at the Large Hadron Collider (LHC).
It would also be a common natural phenomenon induced by cosmic rays.

All this assumes that the theory of general relativity remains valid at these small distances. If it does not, then other, currently unknown, effects might limit the minimum size of a black hole. Elementary particles are equipped with a quantum-mechanical, intrinsic angular momentum (spin). The correct conservation law for the total (orbital plus spin) angular momentum of matter in curved spacetime requires that spacetime is equipped with torsion. The simplest and most natural theory of gravity with torsion is the Einstein–Cartan theory. Torsion modifies the Dirac equation in the presence of the gravitational field and causes fermion particles to be spatially extended. The energy necessary to produce such a black hole is 39 orders of magnitude greater than the energies available at the Large Hadron Collider, indicating that the LHC cannot produce mini black holes. But if black holes are produced, then the theory of general relativity is proven wrong and does not exist at these small distances. The rules of general relativity would be broken, as is consistent with theories of how matter, space, and time break down around the event horizon of a black hole. This would prove the spatial extensions of the fermion limits to be incorrect as well. The fermion limits assume a minimum mass needed to sustain a black hole, as opposed to the opposite, the minimum mass needed to start a black hole, which in theory is achievable in the LHC under some conditions.

Stability

Hawking radiation 

In 1975, Stephen Hawking argued that, due to quantum effects, black holes "evaporate" by a process now referred to as Hawking radiation in which elementary particles (such as photons, electrons, quarks and gluons) are emitted. His calculations showed that the smaller the size of the black hole, the faster the evaporation rate, resulting in a sudden burst of particles as the micro black hole suddenly explodes.

Any primordial black hole of sufficiently low mass will evaporate to near the Planck mass within the lifetime of the Universe. In this process, these small black holes radiate away matter. A rough picture of this is that pairs of virtual particles emerge from the vacuum near the event horizon, with one member of a pair being captured, and the other escaping the vicinity of the black hole. The net result is the black hole loses mass (due to conservation of energy). According to the formulae of black hole thermodynamics, the more the black hole loses mass, the hotter it becomes, and the faster it evaporates, until it approaches the Planck mass. Thus, a thermodynamic description breaks down. Such a micro black hole would also have an entropy of only 4 nats, approximately the minimum possible value. At this point then, the object can no longer be described as a classical black hole, and Hawking's calculations also break down.

While Hawking radiation is sometimes questioned, Leonard Susskind summarizes an expert perspective in his book The Black Hole War: "Every so often, a physics paper will appear claiming that black holes don't evaporate. Such papers quickly disappear into the infinite junk heap of fringe ideas."

Conjectures for the final state 
Conjectures for the final fate of the black hole include total evaporation and production of a Planck-mass-sized black hole remnant. Such Planck-mass black holes may in effect be stable objects if the quantized gaps between their allowed energy levels bar them from emitting Hawking particles or absorbing energy gravitationally like a classical black hole. In such case, they would be weakly interacting massive particles; this could explain dark matter.

Primordial black holes

Formation in the early Universe 
Production of a black hole requires concentration of mass or energy within the corresponding Schwarzschild radius. It was hypothesized by Zel'dovich and Novikov first and independently by Hawking that, shortly after the Big Bang, the Universe was dense enough for any given region of space to fit within its own Schwarzschild radius. Even so, at that time, the Universe was not able to collapse into a singularity due to its uniform mass distribution and rapid growth. This, however, does not fully exclude the possibility that black holes of various sizes may have emerged locally. A black hole formed in this way is called a primordial black hole and is the most widely accepted hypothesis for the possible creation of micro black holes. Computer simulations suggest that the probability of formation of a primordial black hole is inversely proportional to its mass. Thus, the most likely outcome would be micro black holes.

Expected observable effects 
A primordial black hole with an initial mass of around  would be completing its evaporation today; a less massive primordial black hole would have already evaporated. Under optimal conditions, the Fermi Gamma-ray Space Telescope satellite, launched in June 2008, might detect experimental evidence for evaporation of nearby black holes by observing gamma ray bursts. It is unlikely that a collision between a microscopic black hole and an object such as a star or a planet would be noticeable. The small radius and high density of the black hole would allow it to pass straight through any object consisting of normal atoms, interacting with only few of its atoms while doing so. It has, however, been suggested that a small black hole of sufficient mass passing through the Earth would produce a detectable acoustic or seismic signal.
On the moon, it may leave a distinct type of crater, still visible after billions of years.

Human-made micro black holes

Feasibility of production 

This is far beyond the limits of any current technology. It is estimated  that to collide two particles to within a distance of a Planck length with currently achievable magnetic field strengths would require a ring accelerator about 1,000 light years in diameter to keep the particles on track.

However, in some scenarios involving extra dimensions of space, the Planck mass can be as low as the TeV range. It was argued in 2001 that, in these circumstances, black hole production could be an important and observable effect at the LHC or future higher-energy colliders. Such quantum black holes should decay emitting sprays of particles that could be seen by detectors at these facilities. A paper by Choptuik and Pretorius, published in 2010 in Physical Review Letters, presented a computer-generated proof that micro black holes must form from two colliding particles with sufficient energy, which might be allowable at the energies of the LHC if additional dimensions are present other than the customary four (three spatial, one temporal).

Safety arguments 

Hawking's calculation and more general quantum mechanical arguments predict that micro black holes evaporate almost instantaneously. Additional safety arguments beyond those based on Hawking radiation were given in the paper, which showed that in hypothetical scenarios with stable micro black holes massive enough to destroy Earth, such black holes would have been produced by cosmic rays and would have likely already destroyed astronomical objects such as planets, stars, or stellar remnants such as neutron stars and white dwarfs.

Black holes in quantum theories of gravity 
It is possible, in some theories of quantum gravity, to calculate the quantum corrections to ordinary, classical black holes. Contrarily to conventional black holes, which are solutions of gravitational field equations of the general theory of relativity, quantum gravity black holes incorporate quantum gravity effects in the vicinity of the origin, where classically a curvature singularity occurs. According to the theory employed to model quantum gravity effects, there are different kinds of quantum gravity black holes, namely loop quantum black holes, non-commutative black holes, and asymptotically safe black holes. In these approaches, black holes are singularity-free.

Virtual micro black holes were proposed by Stephen Hawking in 1995 and by Fabio Scardigli in 1999 as part of a Grand Unified Theory as a quantum gravity candidate.

See also 

 Black hole electron
 Black hole starship
 Black holes in fiction
 ER=EPR
 Kugelblitz (astrophysics)
 Strangelet

Notes

References

Bibliography 

 
 
 A. Barrau et al., Astron. Astrophys. 388 (2002) 676, Astron. Astrophys. 398 (2003) 403, Astrophys. J. 630 (2005) 1015 : experimental searches for primordial black holes thanks to the emitted antimatter
 A. Barrau & G. Boudoul, Review talk given at the International Conference on Theoretical Physics TH2002 : cosmology with primordial black holes
 A. Barrau & J. Grain, Phys. Lett. B 584 (2004) 114 : searches for new physics (quantum gravity) with primordial black holes
 P. Kanti, Int. J. Mod. Phys. A19 (2004) 4899 : evaporating black holes and extra dimensions
 D. Ida, K.-y. Oda & S.C.Park, : determination of black hole's life and extra dimensions
 Sabine Hossenfelder: What Black Holes Can Teach Us, hep-ph/0412265
 L. Modesto, PhysRevD.70.124009: Disappearance of Black Hole Singularity in Quantum Gravity
 P. Nicolini, A. Smailacic, E. Spallucci, j.physletb.2005.11.004: Noncommutative geometry inspired Schwarzschild black hole
 A. Bonanno, M. Reuter, PhysRevD.73.083005: Spacetime Structure of an Evaporating Black Hole in Quantum Gravity
 : X-ray astronomy in the laboratory with a miniature compact object produced by laser-driven implosion
 Harrison, B. K.; Thorne, K. S.; Wakano, M.; Wheeler, J. A. Gravitation Theory and Gravitational Collapse, Chicago: University of Chicago Press, 1965 pages 80–81

External links 
 Astrophysical implications of hypothetical stable TeV-scale black holes
 Mini Black Holes Might Reveal 5th Dimension – Ker Than. Space.com June 26, 2006 10:42am ET
 Doomsday Machine Large Hadron Collider? – A scientific essay about energies, dimensions, black holes, and the associated public attention to CERN, by Norbert Frischauf (also available as Podcast)

+
Hypothetical astronomical objects
Hypothetical particles